Ri Hae Yon (born ) is a North Korean female artistic gymnast, representing her nation at international competitions.  

She participated at the 2004 Summer Olympics.

References

External links

http://www.alamy.com/stock-photo-north-korean-gymnast-ri-hae-yon-performs-during-the-floor-exercise-120542501.html
https://www.youtube.com/watch?v=xjXlkVP6xe8

1988 births
Living people
North Korean female artistic gymnasts
Place of birth missing (living people)
Gymnasts at the 2004 Summer Olympics
Olympic gymnasts of North Korea
21st-century North Korean women